The Dassault Étendard II was a French prototype fighter aircraft initially developed as a follow-on project to the Dassault Mystère series. It was presented to the French Air Force for evaluation but was rejected in favour of the Dassault Mirage III.

Originally designated Mystère XXII, the aircraft was developed in response to a French Air Force requirement for a light, jet-powered fighter-bomber. At around the same time, the NATO NBMR-1 requirement was circulated, also calling for a light strike-fighter, and Dassault developed a very similar aircraft in parallel for that competition (the Étendard VI).

The sole prototype of the Étendard II flew on July 23, 1956 but proved to be somewhat underpowered and showed nothing like the promise of the Mirage series and was quickly abandoned.

A further development of the Étendard concept, the Étendard IV was successfully developed for French Navy service.

Specifications (Étendard II)

See also

References

Bibliography
 

Twinjets
Etendard II
1950s French fighter aircraft
Low-wing aircraft
Cruciform tail aircraft
Aircraft first flown in 1956